Cryptocephalus merus is a species of case-bearing leaf beetle in the family Chrysomelidae. It is found in Arizona and Texas (the United States of the America), possibly also in Mexico. It measures  in length.

References

Further reading

 
 

merus
Beetles of the United States
Beetles described in 1932
Articles created by Qbugbot